José Naranjo may refer to:
José Naranjo (scout) (1662–1720), Pueblo Indian scout for the Kingdom of Spain
José Naranjo (footballer, born 1926) (1926–2012), Mexican footballer
José Naranjo (footballer, born 1994), Spanish footballer

See also
 José Luis Naranjo y Quintana (born 1944), Mexican politician